Crystal is the debut album by Japanese sister duo Double, released on June 2, 1999 by For Life Music Entertainment. The first press edition of the album came with the CD case with a clear background, and a back insert with the duo posing with the track names on the left side. Inside the case comes with a photobook with different pages consisting of red, orange, yellow, green, blue, and pink spelling Double letter by letter. The RIAJ has certified it 2× platinum, recognizing over 600,000+ shipments throughout Japan.  On the Oricon charts, the album's peak position was number two.

History
Double had previously released two singles without much success. Their debut single, "For Me" was a commercial failure, and their follow-up single, "Desire" failed to make a big impression with sales.

Their third single "Bed" gained some recognition in Japan and their fourth single "Shake" was their first successful single selling over 100,000 copies, becoming the only single to sell more than 100,000 copies. It would be their final single as a sister duo before Sachiko's death two months after the single's release.

On May 21, 1999, Sachiko suddenly passed away from a subarachnoid hemorrhage at the age of 25 just two weeks before their debut album
was released. Takako was devastated by the loss of her sister and took a break from her music career.

Track listing

Personnel
Doublelead vocals, lyrics 
Sachiko Hirasawabass, chorus
Ryosuke Imaichorus
Takako Hirasawavocal direction

Production
Produced by Ryosuke Imai, Ryosuke Imai for For Life Music Entertainment
Co-produced by Takako
Executive Production by Maestro-T

Charts
Oricon Sales Chart (Japan)

References

1999 debut albums
Double (singer) albums